The 2015 edition of the women's basketball tournament of the African Games was the 11th, organized by FIBA Africa and played under the auspices of FIBA, the basketball sport governing body. The tournament was held from 10 to 18 September 2015 at the Gymnase Makélékélé in Brazzaville, Republic of Congo, contested by 10 national teams and won by Mali.

Squads

Format
The 10 teams were divided into two groups (Groups A+B) for the preliminary round.
Round robin for the preliminary round; the top two teams of each group advanced to the quarterfinals.
From there on a knockout system was used until the final.

Draw

Group stage 

Times given below are in UTC+1.

Group A

Group B

Knockout stage
All matches were played at the: Gymnase Makélékélé, in Brazzaville

9th place match

Quarterfinals

5–8th place

7th place match

5th place match

Semifinals

Bronze medal match

Gold medal match

Final standings

Awards

See also
AfroBasket Women 2015

External links
Results

References

 
Basketball at the African Games – Women's tournament
Women's
2015 in women's basketball